Casper Lindholm Christensen (born 22 August 1968) is a Danish comedian. He has hosted many shows including Casper & Mandrilaftalen, the Danish airing of Shooting Stars and Don't Forget Your Toothbrush (Husk lige tandbørsten), and the Danish version of Deal or No Deal. He also had a leading role in the Danish sit-coms Langt fra Las Vegas (Far from Las Vegas) and Klovn (Clown/Fool).

Life and career
Christensen was born in Munkebo. He started his TV-career in the Danish children's show Hvaffor en Hånd? (Which Hand?) in 1991 but is also well known for hosting the very successful radio program Tæskeholdet (The Whack Pack).

One of Casper Christensen's characteristics early in his career was his appearance, often including big glasses, whacky hairstyle, and an abstract clothing style. Christensen was also well known for his energetic appearance on screen. In this period, Christensen's most notable appearances were Casper & Mandrilaftalen, Tæskeholdet and Safari. In later years, Christensen has toned down his crazy appearance, and made a career shift towards more serious projects. Casper Christensen has also become one of the most sought after Danish TV hosts; hosting more mainstream shows like Grib mikrofonen, Deal no Deal and 8 out of 10 Cats, Da; 9 ud af 10.

On 1 February 2007, Casper returned to radio with the programme Kongen af Danmark (The King of Denmark) on the Danish radio station TV 2 Radio. Casper Christensen quickly left TV2 Radio and instead began writing on the 5th and 6th season of Klovn with his long-time colleague Frank Hvam. The 6th season aired on TV2 Zulu in the spring of 2009. On 2 October 2009, he aired his latest project for the first time on TV 2. It is a live talk show called ALOHA!.

Television work

Filmography

Radio

References

External links

1968 births
Living people
Danish male comedians
Danish stand-up comedians
Danish television presenters
Danish male television actors
Danish male film actors
20th-century Danish male actors
21st-century Danish male actors
People from Kerteminde Municipality